Neblinanthera is a monotypic genus of flowering plants belonging to the family Melastomataceae. The only species is Neblinanthera cumbrensis.

Its native range is Venezuela to Northern Brazil.

References

Melastomataceae
Melastomataceae genera
Monotypic Myrtales genera